Colp or COLP may refer to:

 Colp, Illinois
 A colposcopy, a medical procedure to analyze the cervix.
 Colp, County Meath, Ireland, a small village south of Drogheda.  It takes its name from Inbher Colpa the old name of the Boyne estuary. Colpe is also a civil parish in East Meath.
 Certified Ornamental Landscape Professional, a professional certification by the Professional Landcare Network
 Compliance Officers for Legal Practice, as defined by the Solicitors Regulation Authority